Richton is a town in Perry County, Mississippi. It is part of the Hattiesburg, Mississippi Metropolitan Statistical Area. The population was 1,068 at the 2010 census.

Geography

Demographics

2020 census

As of the 2020 United States census, there were 920 people, 345 households, and 205 families residing in the town.

2000 census
As of the census of 2000, there were 1,038 people, 397 households, and 258 families residing in the town. The population density was 452.6 people per square mile (175.0/km). There were 497 housing units at an average density of 216.7 per square mile (83.8/km). The racial makeup of the town was 76.01% White, 21.19% African American, 0.67% Native American, 0.19% Asian, 0.48% Pacific Islander, 0.48% from other races, and 0.96% from two or more races. Hispanic or Latino of any race were 0.96% of the population.

There were 397 households, out of which 29.7% had children under the age of 18 living with them, 42.6% were married couples living together, 18.9% had a female householder with no husband present, and 34.8% were non-families. 32.0% of all households were made up of individuals, and 15.1% had someone living alone who was 65 years of age or older. The average household size was 2.41 and the average family size was 3.04.

In the town, the population was spread out, with 24.7% under the age of 18, 7.8% from 18 to 24, 21.9% from 25 to 44, 25.2% from 45 to 64, and 20.4% who were 65 years of age or older. The median age was 41 years. For every 100 females, there were 75.3 males. For every 100 females age 18 and over, there were 68.5 males.

The median income for a household in the town was $23,365, and the median income for a family was $33,250. Males had a median income of $34,250 versus $16,000 for females. The per capita income for the town was $17,425. About 22.3% of families and 31.9% of the population were below the poverty line, including 47.7% of those under age 18 and 26.5% of those age 65 or over.

Education
The Town of Richton is served by the Richton School District.

Strategic Petroleum Reserve
The United States Department of Energy has selected Richton as a possible site for the expansion of the Strategic Petroleum Reserve.

Notable people
Roy Cochran, Olympic athlete
George E. Johnson, Sr., entrepreneur
JaCoby Jones, baseball player
Frank Stanford, poet

References

Towns in Perry County, Mississippi
Towns in Mississippi
Hattiesburg metropolitan area